Baba Hassen is a commune in Algiers Province and a suburb of the city of Algiers in northern Algeria. As of the 2008 census, the commune had a population of 23,756.

Notable people

References

Suburbs of Algiers
Communes of Algiers Province